The Empress of China is a 2014 Chinese television series based on events in the 7th and 8th-century Tang dynasty, starring producer Fan Bingbing as the titular character Wu Zetian—the only female emperor (empress regnant) in Chinese history.

It is the third television production by Fan Bingbing Studio and boasts of a budget of over ¥300 million (roughly US$49.53 million). As such, it is believed to be among the most expensive TV series in Chinese history, beating the previous record of ¥280 million by Heroes in Sui and Tang Dynasties (2013). The television series was first broadcast on Hunan Television on 21 December 2014 in mainland China.

Synopsis
During Tang dynasty's 2nd reign, Wu Ruyi (Fan Bingbing) enters the palace at age 14 as an innocent Cairen (Talented Lady) and aspires to serve Emperor Taizong (Zhang Fengyi) as his consort. The Emperor Taizong soon takes notice of her and falls in love with her due to her resemblance to Empress Wende.

He also gives Wu Ruyi the name Meiniang. This incites many to grow jealous of her and Wu Ruyi suffers the machinations of Noble Consort Wei, Pure Consort Yang, Virtuous Consort Yin, Xiao Qiang, and Feng Cairen. Even her best friend Xu Hui (Janine Chang) betrays her to win the Emperor's affections. They set out to destroy her numerous times by falsely accusing her of theft, murder and treachery. She survives by her wits and intelligence but is kept at arm's length by Emperor Taizong due to a prophecy foretelling a woman of Wu stealing the Tang dynasty.

When Emperor Taizong dies, she is sent to a monastery to become a nun. However, the Emperor's youngest son Li Zhi (Aarif Rahman), who later becomes the Emperor Gaozong, has been in love with her since he was a child. He brings her back to the palace and makes her his concubine. During her time as a minor consort to Emperor Taizong, she learned how an effective Emperor rules his court.

She overcomes the schemes of Consort Xiao (Viann Zhang) and Empress Wang (Shi Shi), and suppresses the rebellion of Princess Gaoyang (Mi Lu). Using that knowledge, she helped Li Zhi take back power from his Regent, and herself into the position of Empress meanwhile avenging her daughter's death. She co-ruled with Li Zhi until his death, after which she ruled the country in her own right and established the Zhou dynasty.

Cast

Main
Fan Bingbing as Wu Meiniang (Empress Wu Zetian)
Zhang Fengyi as Li Shimin (Emperor Taizong)
Aarif Rahman as Li Zhi (Emperor Gaozong)
Janine Chang as Xu Hui (Able Consort Xu)

Supporting

Emperor Taizong's harem
Zhang Ting as Noble Consort Wei 
Kathy Chow as Pure Consort Yang 
Zhang Tong as Virtuous Consort Yin
Zhang Ding Han as Empress Wende / Zheng Wanyan
Nie Mei as Able Consort Liu 
Sun Jia Qi as Xiao Qiang
Zhang Xi Ting as Feng Cairen
Liu Zhi Xi as Chen Meiren

Emperor Gaozong's harem
Shi Shi as Empress Wang
Viann Zhang as Consort Xiao
Cui Bing as Liu Shi
Sandra Ma as Helan Min Yue

Royal family
Lee Lee-zen as Prince Li Chenggian
Li Jie as Prince Li Ke
Ren Shan as Li Tai
Xue Yongyu as Li You
Li Yuexi as Crown Princess Su Mei 
Mi Lu as Princess Gaoyang
Cui Can as Li Sujie
Zhang Xuanming as Li Zhong
Chen Jingyuan as childhood Li Zhong
Kang Fuzhen as Li Hong
Wang Wenjie as young Li Xián
Yu Wentong as mid-age Li Xiǎn
Xi Yuli as Wei Shi

Ministers and generals
Li Chen as Li Mu
Wu Xiubo as younger Zhang Jianzhi
Wei Zi as older Zhang Jianzhi
Wang Huichun as Zhangsun Wuji
Wang Qianhng as Zhangsun Chong
Yao Yanlin as Shangguan Yi
Zheng Xiaozhong as Pei Yan
Liu Zuhe as Xu Jingzong
Li Yansheng as Chu Suiliang
Li Guangfu as Wei Zheng
Yu Haoming as Li Chunfeng
Yu Ailei as Li Yifu
Hou Jie as Hou Junji
Liu Xiaoxi as Fang Xuanling
Zhu Xiaohui as Fang Yi'ai, Princess Gaoyang's husband
Sun Ning as Li Shiji
Qin Qidong as Bianji, Princess Gaoyang's illicit lover 
Xu Jie as Di Renjie

Servants
Shen Baoping as Wang De, Emperor Taizong's personal attendant
He Xin as Chengxin, Crown Prince's companion 
Wang Zhen as Chun Ying, Consort Wei's personal attendant
Chen Si Si as Qing Shun, Consort Yang's personal attendant
Tu Liman as Liu Siyao, Consort De's personal attendant
Wang Yanan as Wen Niang, Xu Hui's personal attendant
Gao Yuan as Rui An

Other
Shōta Matsushima as Motsube Amamori, a Japanese chess player

Production
Zhejiang Talent Television & Film, China Film Group Corporation, Evergrande Film Co., Duzhe Publishing Media Co., Jilin Television, and Guangxi Television co-financed the TV series.

A project-starting press conference held on December 28, 2012. Then, the director was Liu Jiang, who quit the project later due to a busy schedule.

The official character posters were released on February 12, 2014. The release of the photos was a gift sent by the crew to the TV audience for the Chinese New Year. Fan said the role was one she had always dreamed of playing and every generation had different interpretations and she hope she could interpret the character in her own way.

Filming began on December 28, 2013, and ended on August 16, 2014. Filming locations included Wuxi, Hengdian World Studios, Nanjing, and Shaoxing.

A broadcast press conference was held in Beijing on December 18, 2014. The TV series has more than 260 sets of clothing for Fan Bingbing and more than 3,000 sets of clothing for the whole crew, with the most expensive piece being the dragon robe at over 500,000 CNY. Wu Hongliang, one of the producers, said the crew had more than 600 people, shooting lasted for almost 10 months, and several writers worked on the script for three years.

Apart from the costumes, The Empress of China placed great importance on displaying accurate historical visuals. The crew went to great lengths to recreate the ancient capital of Chang’an, as well as the grand and imposing imperial palace of the Tang dynasty. The majority of the scenes were filmed using a combination of real-location shoots and special effects. Moreover, the drama established a special warehouse for the design and creation of its many thousand props.

The series' Chinese name was initially Wu Zetian, and then renamed to The Legend of Wu Zetian. Just two days before the broadcasting date, it was renamed again as The Legend of Wu Meiniang. This was required by the State Administration of Radio, Film, and Television (SARFT).

Soundtrack
The series' musical score was composed by Dong Dongdong, who previously wrote the music to No Man's Land and Beijing Love Story. At the first, the production company intended to invite musicians from Korea, Japan and mainland China, but the idea was changed due to China's censorship policy on TV series changing. Initially, one TV series could broadcast on four satellite channels, but in 2015 it was revised to allow broadcasting on two satellite channels. Considering the cost recovery and the busy post-production schedule, the production company invited the native composer Dong Dongdong.

The opening song was called Qian Qiu, sung by Sun Nan.

The closing theme song was called Wu Zi Bei, sung by Jane Zhang, lyrics by Vincent Fang, and music by Aarif Rahman. The song premiered during a Sina live stream session on 16 December 2014 and topped the New Song Chart as the most listened song with the view count exceeding 1.37 million.

For TVB's broadcast in Hong Kong, the opening song was called The Empress (Chinese: 女皇), sung by Joey Yung.

China and Taiwan

Hong Kong

Broadcast
The Empress of China began airing from December 21, 2014, exclusively on Hunan Television in mainland China, and has also been broadcast on Chung T'ien Television in Taiwan, TVB in Hong Kong, and Golden Town Film Co., Ltd in Thailand.

Mainland China
The TV drama was suspended for four days from December 28, 2014, to January 1, 2015. Hunan Television said on its official Sina Weibo account that the TV drama will stop from Sunday on due to 'technical' reasons but will return to the screen on January 1, 2015. However, it was reported that the actual reason for this suspension was because the dresses were 'too exposing', especially in the chest region and the broadcasting authorities demanded the broadcaster edit the TV drama and then submit again for censorship. The show returned to screens on January 1, 2015, but with edited scenes that removed much of the shots of cleavage area. Wide shots and close-ups were heavily employed to minimize the amount of cleavage. Chinese Internet users responded by complaining about the censorship on Weibo. Several complained that they would not be able to see the hundreds of costume changes by Fan Bingbing. Some reports noted that the Tang dynasty was one of the greatest dynasties in ancient China, and women were known to wear revealing attire.

Likewise, any scenes showing intimacy or affection between the protagonists were completely cut (like the bath tub or kissing scenes), which makes following the drama's storyline difficult at times.

Taiwan

Taiwan began airing the drama March 30, 2015, on cable channel CTi TV and free-to-air channel CTV. Both stations aired the series in its entirety, un-cut and un-censored.

Hong Kong

Hong Kong free-to-air channel TVB Jade began broadcast of the drama on April 26, 2015. Due to the length of the series, the drama was reduced by ten episodes and TVB also changed their broadcast schedule to have the drama air throughout the entire week Sunday to Saturday. In order to avoid the cleavage exposing controversy without zooming-in scenes like the version aired in mainland China, TVB hired CGI experts to add an effect clothing to cover up the cleavage. TVB also aired original audio and a Cantonese dubbed version on their Jade channel.

Reception
The Empress of China was a commercial success. The show's first episode broke rating records. Despite the re-edits to please SARFT, the viewership ratings of The Empress of China remained at an all-time high. Its final episode achieved a rating of 4%, making it the highest rated drama of the year.

Despite its success, the drama received mixed to negative reviews. The audiences praised the beautiful costume, but complained about the slow narrative rhythm and said the plot turns dramatically without foreshadowing, as it's broken and not linked well at all. Some reports noted that the protagonist was overpowered, and was not a factually accurate account of history. Wu Zetian had several battles with her opponent Zhangsun Wuji in history, but in the drama, Wu Zetian was portrayed as an innocent woman.

 Mainland China

|-
| 1-3 ||  || style="color:blue" | 2.280 || style="color:blue" | 6.050 || 1 || style="color:blue" | 2.14 || style="color:blue" | 6.13 || 2 
|-
| 4-6 ||  || 2.396 || 6.681 || 1 || 2.45 || 7.23 || 1 
|-
| 7-9 ||  || 2.714 || 7.774|| 1 || 2.65 || 7.98 || 1 
|-
| 10-12 ||  || 2.469 || 6.936 || 1 || 2.66 || 7.69 || 1 
|-
| 13-15 ||  || 2.678 || 7.378 || 1 || 2.77 || 8.09 || 1 
|-
| 16 ||  || 2.429 || 6.513 || 1 || rowspan=2 | 2.54 || rowspan=2 | 6.56 || rowspan=2 | 1 
|-
| 17 ||  || 2.546 || 6.748 || 1 
|- 
| 18-20 ||  || 2.579 || 6.944 || 1 || rowspan=3 | 2.65 || rowspan=3 | 7.27 || rowspan=3 | 1 
|-
| 21 ||  || 2.533 || 6.838 || 1 
|-
| 22 ||  || 2.400 || 6.274 || 1 
|-
| 23-25 ||  || 2.697 || 7.401 || 1 || 2.52 || 7.33 || 1 
|-
| 26-28 ||  || 2.722 || 7.304 || 1 || 2.46 || 7.06 || 1 
|-
| 29-31 ||  || 2.857 || 7.712 || 1 || 2.57 || 7.25 || 1 
|-
| 32-34 ||  || 2.716 || 7.209 || 1 || 2.58 || 7.26 || 1 
|-
| 35-37 ||  || 2.849 || 7.721 || 1 || 2.59 || 7.48 || 1 
|-
| 38 ||  || 2.443 || 6.472 || 1 || rowspan=3 | 2.66 || rowspan=3 | 7.23 || rowspan=3 | 1 
|-
| 39 ||  || 2.830 || 7.390 || 1 
|-
| 40-42 ||  || 2.773 || 7.409 || 1 
|-
| 43-45 ||  || 2.648 || 7.235 || 1 || 2.67 || 7.61 || 1 
|-
| 46-48 ||  || 3.121 || 8.363 || 1 || 2.95 || 8.28 || 1 
|-
| 49-51 ||  || 2.780 || 7.389 || 1 || 3.09 || 8.68 || 1 
|-
| 52-54 ||  || 2.982 || 8.070 || 1 || 3.15 || 8.73 || 1 
|-
| 55 ||  || 2.417 || 6.424 || 1 || rowspan=3 | 3.14 || rowspan=3 | 8.45 || rowspan=3 | 1 
|-
| 56 ||  || 3.067 || 7.952 || 1 
|-
| 57-59 ||  || 2.983 || 7.938 || 1 
|-
| 60-62 ||  || 3.034 || 8.235 || 1 || 3.28 || 9.20 || 1 
|-
| 63-65 ||  || 3.062 || 8.243 || 1 || 3.40 || 9.41 || 1 
|-
| 66-68 ||  || 3.088 || 8.282 || 1 || 3.33 || 9.21 || 1 
|-
| 69-71 ||  || 3.411 || 8.855 || 1 || 3.96 || 10.69 || 1 
|-
| 72 ||  || 2.634 || 6.981 || 1 || rowspan=3 | 3.46 || rowspan=3 | 9.36 || rowspan=3 | 1 
|-
| 73 ||  || 2.711 || 7.277 || 1 
|-
| 74-76 ||  || 3.264 || 8.420 || 1 
|-
| 77-79 ||  || 3.378 || 8.898 || 1 || 3.52 || 9.81 || 1 
|-
| 80-82 ||  || 3.551 || 9.273 || 1 || 4.00 || 10.91 || 1 
|-
| 83-85 ||  || 3.737 || 9.623 || 1 || 4.35 || 11.85 || 1 
|-
| 86-88 ||  || 3.515 || 9.108 || 1 || 4.10 || 11.16 || 1 
|-
| 89 ||  || 2.657 || 6.992 || 1 || rowspan=3 | 3.71 || rowspan=3 | 9.99 || rowspan=3 | 1 
|-
| 90 ||  || 2.434 || 6.407 || 1 
|-
| 91-92 ||  || 3.313 || 8.763 || 1 
|-
| 93-94 ||  || 4.102 ||  10.901 || 1 || 4.64 || 12.80 || 1 
|-
| 95-96||  || style="color:red" | 4.234 || style="color:red" | 11.171  || 1 || style="color:red" | 5.08 || style="color:red" | 13.68 || 1 
|-align=center
| colspan=2  | Total average || 2.959 || 7.926 || 1 in 2014 || 3.17 || 8.81 || 1 in 2014 

Taiwan

|-
| 1-5 || 1 || March 30, 2015 - April 3, 2015 || 1.21 || 4
|-
| 6-10 || 2 || April 6, 2015 - April 10, 2015 || 1.50 || 4
|-
| 11-15 || 3 || April 13, 2015 - April 17, 2015 || 1.64 || 4
|-
| 16-20 || 4 || April 20, 2015 - April 24, 2015 || 1.90 || 3
|-
| 21-25 || 5 || April 27, 2015 - May 1, 2015 || 1.80 || 3
|-
| 26-30 || 6 || May 4, 2015 - May 8, 2015 || 1.91 || 3
|-
| 31-35 || 7 || May 11, 2015 - May 15, 2015 || 1.90 || 3
|-
| 36-40 || 8 || May 18, 2015 - May 22, 2015 || 2.21 || 3
|-
| 41-45 || 9 || May 25, 2015 - May 29, 2015 || 2.27 || 3
|-
| 46-50 || 10 || June 1, 2015 - June 5, 2015 || 2.37 || 3
|-
| 51-55 || 11 || June 8, 2015 - June 12, 2015 || 2.49 || 3
|-
| 56-60 || 12 || June 15, 2015 - June 19, 2015 || 2.38 || 3
|-
| 61-65 || 13 || June 22, 2015 - June 26, 2015 || 2.75 || 3
|-
| 66-70 || 14 || June 29, 2015 - July 3, 2015 || 2.76 || 3
|-
| 71-75 || 15 || July 6, 2015 - July 10, 2015 || 3.16 || 3
|-
| 76-80 || 16 || July 13, 2015 - July 17, 2015 || 2.72 || 3
|-
| 81-84 || 17 || July 20, 2015 - July 23, 2015 || 3.06 || 3

Hong Kong

Awards and nominations

International broadcast

References

External links
 

2014 Chinese television series debuts
2015 Chinese television series endings
Chinese historical television series
Television series set in the Tang dynasty
Television series set in the Zhou dynasty (690–705)
Works about Wu Zetian
Cultural depictions of Wu Zetian
Cultural depictions of Di Renjie
Television series set in the 7th century
Television censorship in China
Censored television series
Hunan Television dramas